11th Division or 11th Infantry Division may refer to:

Infantry divisions
 11th Division (Australia)
 11th Infantry Division (Bangladesh), see Md. Rashed Amin
 11th Division (German Empire)
 11th Reserve Division (German Empire)
 11th Bavarian Infantry Division,  a unit of the Royal Bavarian Army, part of the Imperial German Army, in World War I
 11th SS Volunteer Panzergrenadier Division Nordland
 11th Infantry Division (Wehrmacht)
 11th Infantry Division (Greece)
 11th Indian Division, a unit of the British Indian Army during World War I
 11th Infantry Division (India)
 11th Infantry Division Brennero, Kingdom of Italy
 11th Division (Imperial Japanese Army)
 11th Infantry Division (Pakistan)
 11th Infantry Division (Poland)
 11th Infantry Division (Russian Empire)
 11th Division (Spain)
 11th Division (Sri Lanka)
 11th Infantry Division (Thailand), se Apirat Kongsompong
 11th (East Africa) Division, a colonial unit of the British Empire during World War II
 11th (Northern) Division, a unit of the British Army during World War I
 11th Infantry Division (United States), a unit in World War I and World War II
 11th Rifle Division (disambiguation)

Airborne divisions
 11th Airborne Division (United States)

Armored divisions
 11th Panzer Division (Wehrmacht), Germany
 11th Armoured Division (United Kingdom)
 11th Armored Division (United States)

Aviation divisions
 11th Air Division, a unit of the United States Air Force in Alaska

Air defense divisions
 11th Air Defense Division, Yugoslavia

See also 
 11th Army (disambiguation)
 XI Corps (disambiguation)
 11th Group (disambiguation)
 11th Brigade (disambiguation)
 11th Regiment (disambiguation)
 11th Battalion (disambiguation)
 11 Squadron (disambiguation)